The Girls' Youth Pan-American Volleyball Cup is a bi-annual Continental Cup organized by NORCECA for U19 teams from all over America (North-, South- and Central America, and the Caribbean)

History

Medal table

See also
 Women's Pan-American Volleyball Cup
 Women's Junior Pan-American Volleyball Cup
 Boys' Youth Pan-American Volleyball Cup

References

External links
 NORCECA 

Pan-American Volleyball Cup
Women's Pan-American Volleyball Cup
Recurring sporting events established in 2011